Black oak is a common name for several species of tree. These include:

 Quercus kelloggii, the California black oak, from the western United States
 Quercus velutina, the black oak, from the eastern United States and Canada
 Casuarina pauper, an Australian tree species
 Trigonobalanus excelsa, an oak relative from Colombia

Quercus taxa by common names